Pashmina is a debut graphic novel written by Nidhi Chanani. The novel focuses on the relationship between an Indian-American mother and her teenage daughter.

Synopsis
Protagonist Priyanka Das's mother leaves India many years ago and refrains from revealing why, but Priyanka's discovery of a pashmina shawl hidden in a suitcase helps her imagine a homeland she has never been to.

Adaptation

On March 6, 2019, it was reported that Gurinder Chadha will be directing an animated musical feature film based on the novel for Netflix. It will be produced by Ashok Amritraj.

References

2017 debut novels
2017 American novels
2017 graphic novels